
The year 508 BC was a year of the pre-Julian Roman calendar. In the Roman Empire it was known as the Year of the Consulship of Poplicola and Tricipitinus (or, less frequently, year 246  Ab urbe condita). The denomination 508 BC for this year has been used since the early medieval period, when the Anno Domini calendar era became the prevalent method in Europe for naming years. 508 BC was the year Ancient Athens was founded.

Greece 
Athenian democracy in the city of Athens is established under Cleisthenes following the tyranny of Hippias.

Italy 
 A war is fought between Rome and Clusium.
 Clusium fights a war with Aricia.
 The office of pontifex maximus is created in Rome.

References

 
500s BC